H. Dobbelaer was a stained glass designer and maker at Bruges, Belgium around 1880. An example of his work depicting Joseph being reunited with his brothers can be seen at St Mary's church Cottingham, chancel south side second window.

External links
 St Mary's church, Cottingham

Belgian stained glass artists and manufacturers
Belgian artists
Year of death missing
Year of birth missing